University of Creative Technology Chittagong (also known as UCTC)  is a private university in Chittagong, Bangladesh. It was established in 2015 under the Private University Act, 2010. The university offers undergraduate and post-graduate programmes taught in English.

History 

University of Creative Technology Chittagong (UCTC) is one of the newest technology based government and UGC approved private universities in Bangladesh. The credit for establishing this university goes to University of Creative Technology Chittagong Trust (UCTCT), the founder organization of the university, all the members of this trust, and specially Mr. Mohammad Osman who is the dreamer of this university. UCTCT is a non-political and non-profit oriented voluntary organization, registered in December 2014, under the Societies Act XXI of 1860 with the Government of the People's Republic of Bangladesh. Seeing the absence of institutions of higher learning based on technology and with innovative vision, UCTCT responded to the need for a university under private initiative in the public sector. The Trust discussed the concept of a private research based technological university in this region with a group of intellectuals, thinkers, and educationists, from home and abroad. Dedicated and creative personalities came forward to materialize the dream of such an institution by putting their ideas, energies and fulfilling other requirements. On June 17, 2015 University Grants Commission of Bangladesh (UGC) visited this university for inspection and provided satisfactory report on campus and necessary documents.

Administration 
 Vice-Chancellor: Mohammad Yunus
 Pro Vice-Chancellor: Zahid Hossain Sharif
 Treasurer: Ahmed Sharif Talukder
 Registrar: Salahuddin Ahmed

Academic session
The academic session at University of Creative Technology Chittagong comprises two semesters. Each semester consists of six months.
 Spring (January to June)
 Autumn (July to December)

Academic programmes 
University of Creative Technology Chittagong offers seven programmes under three schools.

School of Business 
 Bachelor of Business Administration
 Master of Business Administration

School of Science and Engineering 
 Bachelor of Scicence (BSc) in Mechanical Engineering
 Bachelor of Scicence (BSc) in Civil Engineering
 Bachelor of Scicence (BSc) in Computer Science and Engineering

School of Arts and Social Science 
 Bachelor of Arts (BA) (Hons) in English Language and Literature
 Master of Public Health

References

External links
 Official website
 

2014 establishments in Bangladesh
Educational institutions established in 2014
Universities and colleges in Chittagong
Private universities in Bangladesh